Moyale Airport , also referred to as Moyale Lower Airport, is an airport located in the town of Moyale, Marsabit County, in the northern part of the Republic of Kenya, at the international border with Ethiopia. The geographic coordinates of this airport are:3° 27' 54.00"N, 39° 6' 18.00"E (Latitude:3.46500; Longitude:39.10500).

Overview
Moyale Airport, Kenya is a civilian airport that serves the town of Moyale and surrounding communities. At the moment there are no known regular, scheduled, airline services to Moyale Airport, Kenya.

Airlines and destinations
Adeshfly  Airlines operated by FLY540

See also
 Kenya Airports Authority
 Kenya Civil Aviation Authority
 List of airports in Kenya

References

External links
 Kenya Airports Authority
 Location of Moyale Airport at Google Maps
 
 
 

Airports in Kenya
Moyale District
Eastern Province (Kenya)